The annular ligaments of the toes are the annular part of the fibrous sheathes of the toes.  These strong transverse bands of fibrous tissue cross the flexor tendons at the level of the upper half of the proximal phalanges of the foot.

Ligaments
Lower limb anatomy
Toes